The 2018–19 Serie B (known as Serie BKT for sponsorship reasons) was the 87th season of Serie B in Italy since its establishment in 1929.

A total of 19 teams contested in the 2018–19 season, instead of the usual 22 teams, due to the exclusion of Bari, Cesena and Avellino. There are 12 teams returning from the 2017–18 Serie B season, 4 promoted from 2017–18 Serie C (Livorno, Padova, Lecce, Cosenza) and 3 relegated from 2017–18 Serie A (Crotone, Hellas Verona, Benevento).

Teams
The list of teams for the season was originally expected to feature 15 teams from the 2017–18 Serie B, as well as three teams who were relegated from the 2017–18 Serie A (Crotone, Verona and Benevento) and four promoted from the 2017–18 Serie C: league winners Livorno, Padova and Lecce, plus national playoff winners Cosenza.

Later in July, Bari and Cesena renounced on their participation to the league due to serious financial issues, whereas Avellino was excluded due to financial irregularities. Foggia was admitted, but it had eight points deducted.

Following these event, the Serie B league assembly voted in favour of reducing the number of teams from 22 to 20; this move was promptly revoked by the Italian Football Federation due to bureaucratic issues who would not allow to change the league format for the current season.

On 7 August, Avellino was finally excluded from the Serie B after losing on their appeal verdict to be readmitted in the league.

Although it was expected that the three vacancies were to be filled by Catania, Novara and Siena, however Pro Vercelli and Ternana disagreed, and on 10 August, the Lega B announced the 2018–19 season would go ahead with 19 teams instead of the regular 22. The Italian Football Federation formalized the change of format for the Serie B from 22 to 19 teams later on 13 August.

Stadiums and locations

Number of teams by regions

Personnel and kits

* Starting from this season, the two new unique institutional sponsors for all the teams participating in the Serie B tournament (except for Brescia) are Unibet (on the back under the numbering) and Facile Ristrutturare (on the left sleeve as a patch).

Managerial changes

League table

Positions by round
The table lists the positions of teams after each week of matches. In order to preserve chronological evolvements, any postponed matches are not included to the round at which they were originally scheduled, but added to the full round they were played immediately afterwards.

Results

Promotion play-offs
Six teams could contest the promotion play-offs depending on the point differential between the third and fourth-placed teams. It began with a preliminary one-legged round played at the home venue of the higher placed team, involving the teams placed fifth to eight. The two winning teams advanced to play the third and fourth-placed teams in the two-legged semi-finals. Those winning teams advanced to the two-legged final, where the winner was promoted to play in Serie A the following season. In the two-legged rounds, the higher seeded team played the second game at home.

Preliminary round

Semi-finals

First leg

Second leg

Finals

First leg

Second leg

Relegation play-out
The relegation play-out was originally scheduled to be played between the 15th and the 16th placed teams in the table — Venezia and Salernitana. However, following the relegation of Palermo to the bottom of the table due to administrative offense (financial irregularities), the Lega B announced no relegation play-off would be held, thus effectively relegating Foggia directly.

However, on 23 May 2019, the Regional Administrative Tribunal (TAR) of Lazio declared void the procedure followed by the Lega B, provisionally reintroducing the play-out, this time between Salernitana (15th) and Foggia (16th), in accordance with the new standings after Palermo were subsequently placed at the bottom of the league table due to financial irregularities. The decision was upheld by the Guarantee College of Sports (Collegio di garanzia dello sport) on 27 May.

Finally, on 29 May, the Court of Appeal of the Italian Football Federation (Corte d'Appello della FIGC) annulled the relegation of Palermo, who were sanctioned with 20 points of penalization instead, and hence changed the composition of the matches, causing the immediate relegation of Foggia, and the re-admission to the play-out of Venezia. Nevertheless, the players of both teams threatened to boycott the challenge, regarding it as late in the calendar (25 days after the last match), problematic for holidays and recesses of players, and conflicting with the FIFA International Calendar and a resolution of Lega B, according to which Serie B matches could not be held during the national team period (3–11 June).

Matches 
The higher-placed team played at home for the second leg. If tied on aggregate, extra time and a penalty shoot-out would be played because both teams ended up with the same number of points in the table. The losers would be relegated to Serie C for the following season.

|}

First leg

Second leg

On 12 July, the FIGC retired the professional license of Palermo. According to the new regulations enacted by the FIGC in January 2019, the relegation play-out was consequently considered null and void, and both Venezia and Salernitana were allowed to remain in Serie B.

Season statistics

Top goalscorers

Note
1Player scored 1 goal in the play-offs.
2Player scored 2 goals in the play-offs.
3Player scored 3 goals in the play-offs.

Top assists

Hat-tricks

Note
(H) – Home  (A) – Away

Clean sheets

Note
1Player had 1 clean sheet in the play-offs.
2Player had 2 clean sheets in the play-offs.
3Player had 3 clean sheets in the play-offs.

Attendance data of regular season

References

External links

 Official website

Serie B seasons
1
Italy